Vevey-Funi railway station is a railway station in the municipality of Vevey, in the Swiss canton of Vaud. It is an intermediate stop on the standard gauge Vevey–Chexbres line of Swiss Federal Railways. It is adjacent to the valley station of the Vevey–Chardonne–Mont Pèlerin funicular railway to Mont Pèlerin.

Services 
The following services stop at Vevey-Funi:

References

External links 
 
 

Railway stations in the canton of Vaud
Swiss Federal Railways stations